Matthew Mark Thornhill (born 11 October 1988) is an English footballer who plays for Northern Premier League side Basford United. He has previously played for Nottingham Forest, Brighton & Hove Albion, Cheltenham Town, Hibernian, Buxton, Shaw Lane Aquaforce and Gainsborough Trinity. His career has been disrupted by a medial knee ligament injury.

Career

Nottingham Forest
Thornhill made his professional debut for Nottingham Forest as a substitute at Chester City in the first round of the League Cup, which Forest won 4–2 on penalties after the game finished goalless after normal and extra time. He made his League debut five days later, coming on as a second-half substitute for Kris Commons against Swansea City. On 12 January 2008, the youngster came on as a late substitute against Leyton Orient to score his first professional goal for The Reds, the last of Forest's goals in a 4–0 victory.

Thornhill started his first Forest game when he stepped in at the last minute to replace Chris Cohen in the heart of midfield. He has since been battling for a midfield spot, scoring his second goal of the season in a 1–1 draw at Southend. He helped The Reds finish second in the 2007–08 season in League One, gaining promotion to the Championship. With The Reds gaining promotion, manager Colin Calderwood commented that Thornhill would be given the chance to impress the following season.

On 21 July 2009, Thornhill joined League One side Brighton & Hove Albion on loan as part of the transfer deal which saw Joel Lynch join Nottingham Forest. After making seven appearances for Brighton, Thornhill returned to Nottingham Forest in December. Thornhill then joined League Two side Cheltenham Town on a one-month loan deal in January 2010. His debut for Cheltenham came against Rochdale, and shortly after that his loan deal was extended to the end of the season.

Thornhill was released by Forest in January 2011, with manager Billy Davies alluding to "good young players here who need to move on; who need to go and have a fresh start".

Hibernian
On 21 January 2011, Thornhill agreed a deal to sign for Scottish Premier League club Hibernian until the summer of 2013, subject to a medical. Hibernian confirmed the transfer a few days later, assigning the player squad number 26. His 2010–11 season was ended prematurely by a medial knee ligament injury. Thornhill was released from his contract in January 2012. He had made just 15 appearances for Hibs in his year with the club.

Into the National League System
Thornhill signed for Northern Premier League club Buxton in November 2012.

He signed for Shaw Lane Aquaforce, then of the Northern Counties East Football League, in July 2014. He won promotion with the team to the Northern Premier League Division One South at the end of the 2014–15 season. Thornhill was club captain at Aqauaforce the following season as they reached the play-off final, which the Barnsley club lost to Coalville Town.

On 6 June 2016 Thornhill signed a one-year contract with National League North side Gainsborough Trinity.

On 11 March 2017 Thornhill signed for Northern Premier League side Basford United.

Career statistics

Honours
Nottingham Forest
League One Runner-up: 2008

References

External links

1988 births
Living people
Footballers from Nottingham
English footballers
Association football midfielders
Nottingham Forest F.C. players
Brighton & Hove Albion F.C. players
Cheltenham Town F.C. players
Hibernian F.C. players
Buxton F.C. players
Shaw Lane A.F.C. players
Gainsborough Trinity F.C. players
Basford United F.C. players
English Football League players
Scottish Premier League players
National League (English football) players
Northern Premier League players